Center Stage is a 2000 American teen drama film directed by Nicholas Hytner about a group of young ballet dancers from various backgrounds who enroll at the fictitious American Ballet Academy in New York City. The film explores the issues and difficulties in the world of professional dance, and how each individual copes with the stresses. This movie was Zoe Saldana's and Amanda Schull's film debut.

The single from the film's soundtrack "I Wanna Be with You" is performed by Mandy Moore. The song became Moore's highest-charting song in the US at number 24, becoming her only top 40 song in the nation. It spent 16 weeks on the Billboard Hot 100, and peaked during its 9th week on the chart.

Plot
After a series of countrywide auditions, twelve young dancers gain entry to the American Ballet Academy (which is loosely based on the School of American Ballet), the affiliate school of the American Ballet Company (which appears to be based on either the American Ballet Theatre or the New York City Ballet). They work hard, attending classes every day for weeks to make them the best dancers they can possibly be, and in preparations for a final dance workshop which will determine the three boys and three girls who will be asked to join the company. The workshop will also provide an opportunity for the students to showcase their talent to other ballet companies across the country. Gaining a leading part in the workshop is therefore essential.

Tensions mount between Jonathan Reeves (Peter Gallagher), the company's aging choreographer and director, and Cooper Nielson (Ethan Stiefel), his best dancer, who also wants to choreograph. They also have issues because Kathleen Donahue (Julie Kent), Cooper's ex-girlfriend and fellow dancer, left him to wed Jonathan. Star student Maureen (Susan May Pratt), a closet bulimic who seems poised for success, discovers that life is passing her by when she meets a pre-med student (Eion Bailey) who shows her the merits of a life without ballet, to the dismay of her controlling stage mother (Debra Monk), herself a failed ballet dancer and current ABC employee. Sweet Jody Sawyer (Amanda Schull), despite underdeveloped turn out, body type issues, and poor footwork, is determined to dance professionally, but it appears less and less likely as the movie progresses that she will be good enough. Jody's parents, Jonathan, Maureen, and ballet teacher Juliette Simone (Donna Murphy) try to convince Jody to move on from dance and attend college. Jody refuses to give up on her dream of being in a professional ballet company. Talented, but smart aleck Eva Rodriguez (Zoe Saldana; doubled by SAB alumna and former NYCB member Aesha Ash) from Boston loves to dance but seems destined to be stuck in the back of the corps because of her bad attitude. Tensions also arise between Charlie (Sascha Radetsky), a naturally gifted fellow advanced student from Seattle, and Cooper over Jody; Charlie has a crush on Jody, who had a one-night stand with Cooper and remains infatuated with him.

Despite Jonathan's objections, Cooper choreographs a rock/pop music-based ballet for the workshop. Three ballets are presented; Jonathan and another choreographer create the other two respectively—the two more "traditional" ballets are not danced to actual ballet music, however. The first (not shown, beyond entrances of the corps and soloist from the wings) is to Mendelssohn's Italian Symphony, while Jonathan's ballet (choreographed by Christopher Wheeldon) is set to Rachmaninov's 2nd Piano Concerto. Cooper's ballet (choreographed by Susan Stroman) mirrors the relationship between himself, Jonathan, and Kathleen. Jody, Charlie, and their gay friend Erik (Shakiem Evans) are set to dance the three lead roles when Erik sprains his ankle in a final rehearsal. To Jonathan's protests and Jody's apprehension, Cooper steps in to fill the role, and the tensions between Jody, Charlie, and Cooper play out on the stage.

After the final workshop, Cooper starts his own dance company, much to Jonathan's chagrin, as Cooper's financial backer is a wealthy widow (played by Elizabeth Hubbard) who Jonathan was hoping would donate to American Ballet Company. Cooper asks Jody to be a principal dancer, as her dancing style, though technically deficient, is perfect for his company. He also asks to date her, but Jody turns him down in favor of Charlie. Maureen decides to give up ballet because she finally realizes that ballet is just something she does well and not what she wants in life. She decides to attend regular university and also seek help for her eating disorder. Eva is picked by Jonathan to join ABC after proving her worth in the workshop, surprising everyone by dancing in place of Maureen as the lead in Jonathan's ballet. When Nancy confronts Maureen for quitting, she calls her mother out for her behavior. She points out that ballet was Nancy's passion and that she only did ballet to make Nancy proud because she never got the chance to be a ballet dancer herself. After realizing how unhappy she is, Maureen decided she wants a normal life in attending college and follow her own dreams away from Nancy. Charlie, and fellow advanced students and friends Anna (who was always favored by Jonathan and who danced "Gelsey Kirkland's part" as the lead in the Italian Symphony ballet; played by SAB alumna and former NYCB corps member Megan Pepin) and Erik are also asked to join the American Ballet Company, and Sergei (Ilia Kulik), Charlie and Erik's roommate and friend, joins his girlfriend Galina in the San Francisco Ballet Company.

Cast

Production
Of the main characters who are dancers, four are professional ballet dancers (Amanda Schull, Ethan Stiefel, Sascha Radetsky, and Julie Kent), one is a professional figure skater (Ilia Kulik), one had ballet training (Zoe Saldana), and two were actors with no ballet training (Susan May Pratt and Shakiem Evans). Body doubles were used for many of the major dance sequences. Dancers from New York City Ballet and American Ballet Theatre filled the classrooms of ABA and corps in the workshop ballets, some of them later became principal dancers, including Gillian Murphy, Stella Abrera, Jonathan Stafford, Jared Angle, Janie Taylor and Rebecca Krohn.

The film was choreographed by Susan Stroman who won an American Choreography Award for it.

The subplot in which Cooper attracts the financial support of a flirtatious wealthy female philanthropist is mentioned in an August 15, 2004, The New York Times article entitled "How Much Is That Dancer in the Program?", which revealed that Stiefel has a very similar real-life sponsorship relationship with a philanthropist named Anka Palitz.

Reception

Box office
The film opened at #6 at the box office making US$4,604,621 in its opening weekend. The film has grossed a total of $26,385,941 worldwide.

Critical response
Center Stage received moderate to negative reviews. The film holds a 42% approval rating on Rotten Tomatoes, based on 81 reviews with an average rating of 5.03/10. The site's consensus states: "Viewers willing to sit through soapy plot contrivances to see some excellent dancing might enjoy Center Stage; for everyone else, there's still always Fame."

The New York Times critic A. O. Scott wrote for the film:

Contactmusic.com gave the film just two stars, commenting that:

Other reviewers were more charitable.  Roger Ebert of the Chicago Sun-Times gave the film three stars out of four and wrote that the film "ends with two big ballet numbers, wonderfully staged and danced, and along the way there are rehearsals and scenes in a Broadway popular dance studio that have a joy and freedom."  Meanwhile, Monica Eng of the Chicago Tribune also gave the film three stars out of four and wrote that "In casting for dance talent rather than acting, director Nicolas Hytner may have given up a little dramatic grace, but what he gains in dance footage (that ranges from ballet to jazz to salsa) more than makes up for that." Eng also wrote that "although the film's ending is a little too neat and happy to be realistic, it does leave you with the feeling of young girls taking charge of their lives. In Hollywood films, that's as exotic a dance as you are going to see."

Soundtrack
The single from the film "I Wanna Be with You" is performed by Mandy Moore. The song became Moore's highest-charting song in the US at number 24, becoming her only top 40 song in the nation. It spent 16 weeks on the Billboard Hot 100.

 "I Wanna Be with You" – Mandy Moore
 "First Kiss" – i5
 "Don't Get Lost in the Crowd" – Ashley Ballard
 "We're Dancing" – P.Y.T.
 "Friends Forever" – Thunderbugs
 "Get Used to This" – Cyrena
 "A Girl Can Dream" – P.Y.T.
 "Cosmic Girl" – Jamiroquai
 "Higher Ground" – Red Hot Chili Peppers
 "Come Baby Come" – Elvis Crespo & Gizelle D'Cole
 "The Way You Make Me Feel" – Michael Jackson
 "If I Was the One" – Ruff Endz
 "Canned Heat" – Jamiroquai
 "I Wanna Be with You" (Soul Soul Solution Remix) – Mandy Moore

Sequels

A sequel to the film titled Center Stage: Turn It Up starring Rachele Brooke Smith was first released in cinemas in Australia on October 30, 2008, and debuted in the United States on November 1, 2008, on the Oxygen channel.

Another sequel Center Stage: On Pointe premiered on Lifetime on June 25, 2016. The film stars Nicole Muñoz and former Dance Moms star Chloe Lukasiak and features alumni from the first two films mentoring a younger generation of dancers.

Television series
On May 12, 2020, which was the film's 20th anniversary, it was announced that a follow-up TV series is in development. Jennifer Kaytin Robinson will write, direct and executive produce the series. Laurence Mark, the producer of the original film, will also serve as an executive producer. The series will follow a new group of students at the American Ballet Academy, now run by Cooper Nielson.

References

External links
 
 
 

2000 films
2000s teen drama films
2000s musical drama films
American dance films
American musical drama films
American romantic drama films
American romantic musical films
American teen drama films
American teen romance films
Films about ballet
Columbia Pictures films
2000s English-language films
Films scored by George Fenton
Films directed by Nicholas Hytner
Films set in New York City
Films produced by Laurence Mark
2000 drama films
Works about performing arts education
2000s American films